"The Gift of Christmas" is a 1995 charity single by supergroup Childliners, with the proceeds of the single going to Childline. The song was written by Tony Mortimer of East 17. In a similar ilk to "Do They Know It's Christmas?" by Band Aid, the song features popular chart acts such as MN8, Boyzone, East 17, Backstreet Boys, Dannii Minogue, Peter Andre and more. It peaked at number 9 on the UK Singles Chart, number 10 in Ireland and number 7 in Scotland.

A second CD of "The Gift of Christmas" was also released featuring remixes by Motiv 8, Not Loveland, Matt Darey, Beatmasters and Wand; whilst credited to 'ChildLiner DJs', the artist remains ChildLiners, and the DJs have only remixed the existing track.

Performers
 A Wasp
 A.S.A.P.
 Backstreet Boys
 Boyzone
 C. J. Lewis
 China Black
 Dannii Minogue
 Deuce
 E.Y.C.
 East 17
 Gemini
 Let Loose
 MN8
 Michelle Gayle
 Mike Scott (SOTCAA)
 Nightcrawlers
 Peter Andre
 Podge (TV Puppet)
 Sean Maguire
 The Flood
 Ultimate Kaos
 West End

Track listings
 CD single
 "The Gift of Christmas" (Radio Mix) – 4:06
 "The Gift of Christmas" (Accapella) – 3:56

 CD single (remix)
 "The Gift of Christmas" (Single Version) – 4:06
 "The Gift of Christmas" (Motiv 8 Simply Great) – 5:45
 "The Gift of Christmas" (Not Loveland But Lapland Mix) – 7:09
 "The Gift of Christmas" (Gift Rapped) – 5:32
 "The Gift of Christmas" (Frankincense Making Sense Mix) – 6:30
 "The Gift of Christmas" (Wands Magic Mix) – 5:53

 Cassette single
 "The Gift of Christmas" (Radio Mix) – 4:06
 "The Gift of Christmas" (Accapella) – 3:56

References

1995 singles
Songs written by Tony Mortimer
1995 songs
Christmas charity singles
London Records singles
British Christmas songs